Liberty House may refer to:

 Liberty House Group, a United Kingdom-based multinational steel products company
 Liberty House (department store), a former American department store